Tosin Cole (born 23 July 1992) is an American-born British actor. He is known for various roles in British television series and films. He began his on-screen career starring in The Cut and EastEnders: E20, later securing a regular role as Neil Cooper in the soap opera Hollyoaks. After leaving the show Cole appeared in a range of television series and commercial films for guest appearances and participated in many short films. From October 2018 to January 2021, Cole starred as Ryan Sinclair in Doctor Who.

Early life
Cole moved from New York to London at age 8, with his father and uncle, following his parents' separation. He attended Abbey Wood Secondary School in Greenwich, London. He left school before his A-levels to pursue a career in acting.

Career
In 2009, Cole was part of a theatre production titled Wasted!, a modern reproduction of Shakespeare's Julius Caesar, produced by Intermission Theatre, a company which helps teenagers stay away from crime. In 2010, Cole joined the cast of BBC teen drama The Cut, in which he played the role of Noah Achebe, who was introduced in the third series. In 2011, he filmed parts in two short films titled Me and My Dad and Jasmine.

Cole later secured the role of Sol Levi in EastEnders: E20, a spin-off of the British soap opera EastEnders. The role required Cole to learn to dance and perform his routine in front of professional dance group Flawless in the series finale. He was quoted as saying the experience was "very, very, very stressful." Cole said it was a privilege to work on E20 and said the cast were fantastic. Cole then agreed to reprise the role for the third series. He was then cast as a regular character in soap opera Hollyoaks as Neil Cooper. Neil was one of six new characters the programme introduced, playing the role from 2011 until the character's death in a bus explosion in 2012. He also filmed a television advert as part of the serial's promotional push for the new characters.

The actor went on to star in a 2013 episode of the BBC medical drama Holby City as Keith Potts. He also played his first cinematic film role in Gone Too Far!, portraying Razer. This was followed by another film role in Second Coming. In 2014, came the role of Anthony in the miniseries The Secrets. In 2015, Cole played the characters of Djimon Adomakoh in ITV drama Lewis and Kobina in an episode of historical series Versailles. That year Cole also had a brief appearance in the film Star Wars: The Force Awakens, as the X-Wing pilot Lt. Bastian.

On 4 October 2017, Cole starred in the short film Father of Man. He then played Amjad in the film Unlocked. On 22 October 2017, it was announced that Cole had been cast in the eleventh series of Doctor Who, playing Ryan Sinclair, a companion to The Doctor, played by Jodie Whittaker, starting in 2018. Cole departed the role in 2021 making his last appearance in the New Year's Day special "Revolution of the Daleks".

Filmography

Film

Television

Theatre

References

External links

1992 births
Living people
English male soap opera actors
Black British male actors
English people of Yoruba descent
American people of Yoruba descent
Yoruba male actors
American emigrants to England
People from Greenwich
Male actors from London
Male actors from New York City